"Schön sein" (To be beautiful) is a song by Die Toten Hosen. It's the lead single and the seventh track from the album Unsterblich.

The song is about a wish to be beautiful and rich, which in many people's minds is supposed to make their life better off and bring success.

The single was released with two possible covers: a mirror cover and a rarer poodle cover, both of which are symbols of self-admiring.

Music video
The music video was directed by Stefan Telegdy. It features a car mechanic, played by Ben Becker, who cross-dresses in free time and is shown planning a sex change operation.

Track listing
 "Schön sein" (Frege, van Dannen/Frege, van Dannen) − 3:12
 "You're Dead" (von Holst/Frege, Smith) – 4:41
 "Fußball" (Football) (von Holst/Frege) – 2:09
 "Im Westen nichts Neues" (All quiet on the Western front) (Breitkopf/Frege) – 1:59

Charts

1999 singles
Songs written by Funny van Dannen
Die Toten Hosen songs
Songs written by Campino (singer)
1999 songs